P'iq'iñ Q'ara (Aymara p'iq'iña head, q'ara bare, bald, p'iq'iña q'ara bald,"baldheaded", also spelled Phekheñ Khara) is a mountain in the Bolivian Andes which reaches a height of approximately . It is located in the Cochabamba Department, Ayopaya Province, Cocapata Municipality. It lies northeast of the two lakes named Iskay Qucha (Quechua for "two lakes").

References 

Mountains of Cochabamba Department